Lord Kelvin's Machine is a science fiction novel by American writer James P. Blaylock.  It was released in 1992 by Arkham House in an edition of 4,015 copies.  The author's first book published by Arkham House, the novel is the third in Blaylock's Steampunk series, following The Digging Leviathan (1984) and Homunculus (1986). A substantially different novelette version first appeared in the Mid-December 1985 issue of Isaac Asimov's Science Fiction Magazine.

Plot summary

In Victorian London, Alice, the wife of scientist-explorer Langdon St. Ives, is murdered by his nemesis, the hunchback Dr. Ignacio Narbondo.  St. Ives and his valet, Hasbro, pursue Narbondo across Norway, contesting Narbondo's plot to destroy the earth and, later, efforts to revivify Narbondo's apparently frozen corpse.  In the process St. Ives gains access to a powerful device created by Lord Kelvin, which allows St. Ives to travel through time.

See also

List of steampunk works

Sources

External links 
 

1992 novels
1992 science fiction novels
Steampunk novels
Works originally published in Asimov's Science Fiction
Novels about time travel
Novels set in London
Novels set in Norway